The 51st Regiment Illinois Volunteer Infantry was an infantry regiment that served in the Union Army during the American Civil War.

Service
The 51st  Illinois Infantry was organized at Chicago, Illinois and mustered into Federal service on December 24, 1861.

The regiment was mustered out on September 25, 1865.

Total strength and casualties
The regiment suffered 9 officers and 106 enlisted men who were killed in action or mortally wounded and 1 officer and 134 enlisted men who died of disease, for a total of 250 fatalities.

Commanders
Colonel Gilbert W. Cumming - resigned on September 30, 1862.
Colonel Luther P. Bradley - promoted brigadier general on July 30, 1864.
Lieutenant Colonel Charles W. Davis - discharged June 30, 1865.
Lieutenant Colonel James S. Boyd - mustered out with the regiment.

See also
List of Illinois Civil War Units
Illinois in the American Civil War
51st Illinois Infantry: Letters, Diaries, History

Notes

References
The Civil War Archive

Units and formations of the Union Army from Illinois
1861 establishments in Illinois
Military units and formations established in 1861
Military units and formations disestablished in 1865